Jalan Teluk Muroh (Perak state route A186) is a major road in Perak, Malaysia. It is also a main route to Teluk Batik beach.

List of junctions

References

Teluk Muroh